Pamela Carolina David Gutiérrez (born 6 October 1978) ) is an Argentinian television personality, presenter, voice actress and model. She found fame in the reality TV show El BarTV 2. She currently works as a co-hostess on América TV's Desayuno Americano.

Personal life
David was born in Córdoba, Argentina, the daughter of DyD owner/producer Alberto David. The family later moved to Santiago del Estero where Pamela entered many beauty contests and won the regional contest for the 'Tourism Queen' contest, later winning the national title to be crowned 'National Queen of Tourism in Argentina'.

Marriage
On 3 March 2008, at the age of 29, David married Bruno Lábaque, a noted basketball player for Club Atenas de Córdoba. The religious ceremony was held in the parish of Villa Allende, while the reception party was in Unquillo, both towns in the province of Córdoba, Argentina. The couple has one son, Felipe., and a daughter, Lola.

References

External links
 

1978 births
Living people
Argentine voice actresses
Argentine female models
Argentine television presenters
Argentine women television presenters
People from Córdoba, Argentina
21st-century Argentine women